Vsevolod Vladimirovich Lebedintsev (5 July 1881 – 17 February 1908) was a Russian astronomer and revolutionary. He is primarily known today for his participation in a failed plot in 1908 to assassinate Ivan Shcheglovitov, the Russian Minister of Justice, for which he was tried and executed. He was the inspiration behind the character Werner in Leonid Andreyev's short story "The Seven Who Were Hanged".

References

1881 births
1908 deaths
Scientists from Odesa
Socialist Revolutionary Party politicians
Executed revolutionaries
Russian revolutionaries
Prisoners of the Peter and Paul Fortress